Rudolf Bilas (born 10 November 1992) is a Slovak football midfielder who currently plays for SC Weesen in 2. Liga Interregional.

Club career

iClinic Sereď
Bilas made his Fortuna Liga debut for iClinic Sereď against Železiarne Podbrezová on 25 August 2018, when he came on as a replacement for Filip Pankarićan some ten minutes before the end.

References

External links
 
 
 Futbalnet profile 

1992 births
Living people
People from Svidník
Sportspeople from the Prešov Region
Slovak footballers
Slovak expatriate footballers
Association football midfielders
MŠK Tesla Stropkov players
ŠK Kremnička players
MFK Lokomotíva Zvolen players
FK Poprad players
ŠKF Sereď players
Slovak Super Liga players
2. Liga (Slovakia) players
3. Liga (Slovakia) players
2. Liga Interregional players
Expatriate footballers in Switzerland
Slovak expatriate sportspeople in Switzerland